19982 Barbaradoore, provisional designation , is an eccentric, stony Phocaea asteroid and a recent Mars-crosser from the inner regions of the asteroid belt, approximately 5 kilometers in diameter. It was discovered on 22 January 1990, by American astronomer Eleanor Helin at the Palomar Observatory in California, United States. The asteroid was named after Barbara Doore, a cousin of the discoverer.

Orbit and classification 

When applying the Hierarchical Clustering Method to its proper orbital elements, Barbaradoore is a member of the Phocaea family, a large family of stony S-type asteroids with nearly two thousand known members. It orbits the Sun in the inner main-belt at a distance of 1.7–3.0 AU once every 3 years and 7 months (1,303 days). Its orbit has an eccentricity of 0.29 and an inclination of 22° with respect to the ecliptic.

Recent Mars-crosser and disparate criteria 

As of 2017, Barbaradoore has become a Mars-crossing asteroid (MCA), a dynamically unstable group between the main belt and the near-Earth populations, because its perihelion is at 1.6657, declining from 1.6662 AU just the year before. In the JPL Small-Body Database, an asteroid's perihelion has to be smaller than 1.666 AU in order to classify as MCA, while in the Lightcurve Data Base, that limit is defined at 1.668 AU.

As of 2017, the Minor Planet Center does not classify Barbaradoore as an MCA, due to a differently defined threshold-perihelion of 1.6600 AU. It therefore remains an unspecified main-belt asteroid. Before 2017, when Barbaradoores orbit did not yet cross that of Mars, it was an outer Mars grazer.

Physical characteristics 

Barbaradoore is an assumed stony S-type asteroid, which agrees with the overall spectral type for members of the Phocaea family.

Lightcurve 

In July 2010, a rotational lightcurve of Barbaradoore was obtained from photometric observation by Czech astronomer Petr Pravec at Ondřejov Observatory. Lightcurve analysis gave a well-defined rotation period of  hours with a brightness variation of 0.28 magnitude.

Diameter and albedo 

According to the surveys carried out by NASA's Wide-field Infrared Survey Explorer and its subsequent NEOWISE mission, Barbaradoore has a high albedo between 0.306 and 0.42 with a corresponding diameter of 3.88 to 5.02 kilometers, while the Collaborative Asteroid Lightcurve Link assumes a standard albedo for stony asteroids of 0.20 and calculates a diameter of 5.66 kilometers with an absolute magnitude of 13.6.

Comparison 

With a diameter of approximately 5 kilometers, Barbaradoore is one of the smallest sizable Mars-crossing asteroids compared to 1065 Amundsenia (9.75 km), 1139 Atami (9.35 km), 1508 Kemi (17 km), 1011 Laodamia (7.39 km), 1727 Mette (est 9 km), 1131 Porzia (7.13 km), 1235 Schorria (est. 9 km), 985 Rosina (8.18 km) 1310 Villigera (15.24 km), and 1468 Zomba (7 km); and much smaller than the largest members of this dynamical group, namely, 132 Aethra, 323 Brucia, 2204 Lyyli and 512 Taurinensis, which are larger than 20 kilometers in diameter.

Naming 

This minor planet was named after a cousin of the discoverer, Barbara Hendricks Doore (born 1933). She is described by the discoverer as an admirer of sports and as an appreciated leader and volunteer, who has dedicated much of her time at Cathedral City's Boys and Girls Club in California. The official naming citation was published by the Minor Planet Center on 24 June 2002 .

Notes

References

External links 
 Pravec, P.; Wolf, M.; Sarounova, L. (2010)
 Asteroid Lightcurve Database (LCDB), query form (info )
 Dictionary of Minor Planet Names, Google books
 Asteroids and comets rotation curves, CdR – Observatoire de Genève, Raoul Behrend
 Discovery Circumstances: Numbered Minor Planets (15001)-(20000) – Minor Planet Center
 
 

019982
019982
Discoveries by Eleanor F. Helin
Named minor planets
19900122